Kunwar Divye Pratap Singh (born 1996) is an Indian shooter. He won the bronze medal at the 2015 International Junior Shotgun Cup in Finland. At the 2017 Open Shooting Championships in Thailand, he won gold in the senior men's shotgun double trap category. He represents his home State Uttarakhand at the National Games. He is the son of legislator Kunwar Pranav Singh Champion.

References

External links 
 Profile at International Shooting Sport Federation

1996 births
Living people
Indian male sport shooters